Nine Men's Misery is a site in current day Cumberland, Rhode Island, where nine colonists were tortured by Narragansett warriors during King Philip's War.  A stone memorial was constructed in 1676 and is believed to be the oldest war monument in the United States.

History
On March 26, 1676, during King Philip's War, Captain Michael Pierce led approximately 60 Plymouth Colony militia and 20 Wampanoag warriors in pursuit of the Narragansett tribe, who had burned down several Rhode Island settlements and attacked Plymouth Colony.  Pierce's troops caught up with the Narragansett, Wampanoag, Nashaway, Nipmuck, and Podunk fighters, but were ambushed in what is now Central Falls, Rhode Island. Pierce's troops fought the Narragansett warriors for several hours but were surrounded by the larger force. The battle was one of the biggest defeats of colonial troops during King Philip's War; nearly all of the colonial militia were killed, including Captain Pierce and their Wampanoag allies  (exact numbers vary by account). The Narragansett tribe lost only a handful of warriors.

Ten of the colonists were taken prisoner.  Nine of these men were tortured to death by the Narragansett warriors at a site in Cumberland, Rhode Island, currently on the Cumberland Monastery and Library property, along with a tenth man who survived. The nine men were buried by English colonists who found the corpses and created a pile of stones to memorialize the men.  This pile is believed to be the oldest war memorial in the United States, and a cairn of stones has continuously marked the site since 1676.

The "Nine Men's Misery" site was disturbed in 1790 by medical students led by one Dr. Bowen who were looking for the body of one of the dead colonists named Benjamin Bucklin, who was said to be unusually large with a double row of teeth.  They were stopped by outraged locals.  The site was desecrated several more times until 1928, when the monks who then owned the cemetery built a cemented stone cairn.  The cairn and site can still be visited on the monastery grounds.

Pierce's Fight was followed by the burning of Providence three days later, and then the capture and execution of Canonchet, the chief sachem of the Narragansetts. The war was winding down even at the time that Pierce's party was destroyed, and King Philip himself was killed in August.

References

 Bicknell, T.  (1981).  Addresses and poem in commemoration of the Captain Michael Pierce fight, March 26, 1676.  Helligso.
 Burge, Kathleen, "A Haunting Attraction in R.I.," Boston Globe, December 5, 2007.
 Lepore, J.  (1999).  The Name of War: King Philip's War and the Origins of American Identity.  Vintage.
 Schultz, E., & Touglas, M.  (2000).  King Philip's War: History and Legacy of America's Forgotten Conflict.  Countryman Press.

External links
Nine Men's Misery Marker, Joseph Bucklin Society, accessdate 17 February 2013
Franko, Victor, Nine Men's Misery Part 2 Historical Research, 2003, Joseph Bucklin Society, accessdate 17 February 2013

Archaeological sites in Rhode Island
1676 in the Thirteen Colonies
Buildings and structures completed in 1676
Cumberland, Rhode Island
English colonization of the Americas
History of New England
King Philip's War
Landmarks in Rhode Island
New England
 
Geography of Providence County, Rhode Island
Rhode Island culture